DeChane Cameron (born March 7, 1969) is a former Canadian football quarterback in the Canadian Football League (CFL). He played for the Edmonton Eskimos. Cameron played college football at Clemson. 

Cameron was the MVP of the 1991 Hall of Fame Bowl.

References

1969 births
Living people
People from LaGrange, Georgia
Players of American football from Georgia (U.S. state)
American players of Canadian football
American football quarterbacks
Canadian football quarterbacks
Clemson Tigers football players
Edmonton Elks players